Phosphatidylinositol phosphate may refer to:

 Phosphatidylinositol 3-phosphate, also known as PI(3)P
 Phosphatidylinositol 4-phosphate, also known as PI(4)P
 Phosphatidylinositol 5-phosphate, also known as PI(5)P

Phospholipids